Guruvadi is a village in the Ariyalur taluk of Ariyalur district, Tamil Nadu, India.

Demographics 

 census, Guruvadi had a total population of 2781 with 1400 males and 1381 females.

References 

Villages in Ariyalur district